The discography of American alternative hip hop band from Philadelphia, Pennsylvania Chiddy Bang consists of one studio album, four singles.

Albums

Studio albums

Mixtapes
The Swelly Express (2009)
Air Swell (2010)
Peanut Butter and Swelly (2011)

Extended plays

Singles

As lead artist

As featured artist

Other charted songs

Promotional singles

Music videos

Notes

References

Discographies of American artists